Steingrímur Steinþórsson (12 February 1893 – 14 November 1966) was Icelandic politician. He served as speaker of the Althing from 1949 to 1950. He served as prime minister of Iceland from 14 March 1950 to 11 September 1953. He was a member of the Interim Triumvirate (acting head of state) from 26 January to 31 July 1952, and was a member of the Progressive Party, though never its chairman.

He served as Minister of Agriculture and Social Affairs from 1953 to 1956.

Steingrímur died in Reykjavík on 14 November 1966 following a bout of illness.

References

External links
Icelandic page with short bio and photo

1893 births
1966 deaths
Prime Ministers of Iceland
Speakers of the Althing
Social Affairs ministers of Iceland
Progressive Party (Iceland) politicians